Michelle Laskin Hettleman (born August 26, 1964) is a Democratic member of the Maryland Senate representing District 11 since February 3, 2020. She represented the district in the Maryland House of Delegates from 2015 to 2020. Gov. Larry Hogan appointed Hettleman to the seat vacated by the resignation of Sen. Robert Zirkin.

Personal life
Shelly was raised in the Greengate community in her district. She lives with her husband Jeff in the Dumbarton section of Pikesville.  They have two children: Jonathan and Rachel.

Shelly attended Summit Park Elementary School, Pikesville Junior High School and graduated from Pikesville High School in 1982. She then received a B.A. in Political Science from Northwestern University in 1986.

References

External links
 
 

Democratic Party Maryland state senators
Living people
1964 births
People from Pikesville, Maryland
Northwestern University alumni
21st-century American women politicians
21st-century American politicians
Women state legislators in Maryland